The  is Japanese aerial lift line in Kōbe, Hyōgo, operated by Kōbe City Urban Development. Opened in 1970, the line links Mount Rokkō and Arima Onsen hot spring. The latter, however, is currently out of service, because users shifted to cars and buses.

Basic data
This is the data of Ura-Rokkō Line.
System: Aerial tramway, one track rope, two haulage ropes
Cable length: 
Longest span: 
Spans: 7
Vertical interval: 
Passenger capacity per a cabin: 61
Cabins: 2
Main engine: 200 kW DC motor
Operational speed: 5 m/s
Time required for single ride: 12 minutes

See also

Maya Ropeway
Shin-Kōbe Ropeway
Maya Cablecar
Rokkō Cable Line
List of aerial lifts in Japan

External links
 Rokkō Arima Ropeway official website
 Kōbe City Urban Development official website

Aerial tramways in Japan
1970 establishments in Japan